ABBA: The Album (also known as simply The Album) is the fifth studio album by the Swedish pop group ABBA. It was released in Scandinavia on 12 December 1977 through Polar Music, but due to the massive pre-orders the UK pressing plants were not able to press sufficient copies before Christmas 1977 and so it was not released in the UK until January 1978. The album was released in conjunction with ABBA: The Movie, with several of the songs featured in the film. Altogether the album contains nine songs.

The album contained two UK number-one singles, "Take a Chance on Me" and "The Name of the Game", as well as European hits "Eagle" and "Thank You for the Music".

Background and production
The album includes three songs from ABBA's 1977 tour mini-musical The Girl with the Golden Hair performed during each of their European and Australian shows in 1977. Andersson and Ulvaeus wanted to offer more than "a run through of their hits and assorted album tracks" for their concerts. Although the songs received a "less-than-tumultuous" reception during the first performances of the mini-musical, three of the tracks ("Thank You for the Music", "I Wonder (Departure)" and "I'm a Marionette") were included on the new album. A fourth song written for the musical, "Get on the Carousel", was rewritten as the up-tempo track "Hole in Your Soul" with "a substantial part of the melody [being] incorporated into [its] middle eight". Parts of "Get on the Carousel" appeared in ABBA: The Movie. The "25-minute opus" had storyline about a talented "small-town girl leaving her hometown" on her "quest for stardom", with each song representing a different part of her personality. Fältskog and Lyngstad shared the lead-role and wore matching blonde wigs and costumes "for optimum dramatic effect".

ABBA: The Album was first released on CD in 1984. The album has been reissued in the format by PolyGram (later Universal Music) four times; first in 1997, then in 2001, in 2005 as part of The Complete Studio Recordings box set and again in 2007 as a two disc 'Deluxe Edition'.

On 3 November 2017, the album was released as a double vinyl mastered at Abbey Road Studios using half speed mastering.

Cover artwork
Polar's official cover made by art director Rune Söderqvist featured an entirely white background, and is the basis for current CD versions. However, Epic Records' original UK release of the LP featured a blue background on the front cover, fading to white at the bottom. It also featured a gatefold sleeve. The back cover was altered, incorporating a similar photo of ABBA to that used elsewhere in the world for the inner sleeve, and referencing tracks included in ABBA: The Movie. The inner gatefold was designed to look like an air mail envelope, similar to the style later used for Gracias Por La Música and even had a photo of ABBA incorporated into a stamp in the corner.

This was the first and only time that Epic radically broke away from the standard Polar Music design for an ABBA album. The UK design for ABBA: The Album has only been re-issued on LP format once, in the 2008 european reissue.

Critical reception

The Album received positive reviews from music critics. Bruce Eder from AllMusic website gave the album four out of five stars and wrote that the album marked a "step forward for the group" since they "absorb and assimilate some of the influences around them, particularly the laid-back California sound of Fleetwood Mac (...) as well as some of the attributes of progressive rock" but "without compromising their essential virtues as a pop ensemble". John Rockwell from the Rolling Stone magazine, gave the album a favorable review and wrote that The Album represents an interesting departure from their past formulas like "innocently superficial lyrics, bouncy Europop music, rock energy and amplification, soaring melodies" to a more mature and intelligent record. NME wrote a short review to the album when it turned 30 years old, and wrote that the album "still sounds pleasantly nostalgic" and had "some delicious pop nuggets from their Swedish hatch".

Commercial performance
ABBA: The Album reached No. 1 in many territories. In the UK it debuted at the top and remained there for seven weeks, ending up as the third biggest selling album of the year (behind the movie soundtrack LPs of Saturday Night Fever and Grease). In the US it became their highest charting album during their original run, where during 1978 ABBA undertook a big promotional campaign. Due to the Cold War, Western music was actively discouraged throughout Eastern Europe at the time. Despite this, ABBA: The Album sold an unprecedented one million copies in Poland in 1977, exhausting the country's entire allocation of foreign currency. In Russia, only 200,000 copies were permitted to be pressed.

Track listing
All tracks written by Benny Andersson and Björn Ulvaeus except where noted.

Personnel

Cited from liner notes.

ABBA
 Agnetha Fältskog – lead, harmony, and backing vocals
 Anni-Frid Lyngstad – lead, harmony, and backing vocals
 Björn Ulvaeus – harmony and backing vocals, acoustic and electric rhythm guitars, spoken word lead vocals on “Move On”
 Benny Andersson – harmony and backing vocals, keyboards, synthesizers

Additional musicians
 Lasse Wellander – lead guitar (except “Eagle”), acoustic and electric rhythm guitars
 Janne Schaffer – lead guitar on "Eagle"
 Rutger Gunnarsson – bass, string arrangements
 Ola Brunkert – drums (except “Take A Chance on Me,” “One Man, One Woman,”, and “Thank You For The Music”)
 Roger Palm – drums (on "Take a Chance on Me", "One Man, One Woman", and "Thank You for the Music")
 Lars O. Carlsson – flute, saxophone
 Malando Gassama – percussion

Production
 Benny Andersson – producer, arranger
 Björn Ulvaeus – producer, arranger
 Michael B. Tretow – engineer
 Rune Söderqvist – design
 Barry Levine – photography
 Björn Andersson – illustrations
 Rune Söderqvist – illustrations
 Jon Astley – remastering (1997 re-issue, 2001 re-issue)
 Tim Young – remastering (1997 re-issue)
 Michael B. Tretow – remastering (1997 re-issue, 2001 re-issue)
 Henrik Jonsson – remastering (The Complete Studio Recordings box set)

Charts

Weekly charts

Year-end charts

Certifications and sales

References

ABBA albums
Polar Music albums
1977 albums
Albums produced by Björn Ulvaeus
Albums produced by Benny Andersson
Atlantic Records albums
Epic Records albums
Concept albums
Art rock albums by Swedish artists